Sten Ragnar Svensson (born 22 June 1934) is a retired heavyweight Greco-Roman wrestler from Sweden. He won a silver medal at the 1963 World Championships, finishing fourth in 1958 and 1961. He competed at the 1960, 1964 and 1968 Olympics and placed eighth, fifth and fourth, respectively.

References

1934 births
Living people
Olympic wrestlers of Sweden
Wrestlers at the 1960 Summer Olympics
Wrestlers at the 1964 Summer Olympics
Wrestlers at the 1968 Summer Olympics
Swedish male sport wrestlers
World Wrestling Championships medalists